Jelcz M11 is a Polish step entrance city bus manufactured by Jelczańskie Zakłady Samochodowe in Jelcz-Laskowice near Oława. It was manufactured from 1985 until 1990. From constructional side it was a hybrid made from modified body chassis of Jelcz PR110 and frame and drivetrain of Ikarus 260. During its production there were no significant changes to the construction of the bus.

History

Genesis

In the beginning of the 1970s, the authorities of Polish People's Republic decided to upgrade their city transport fleet. For this purpose between 1970–1972 the authorities conducted trials of different models of buses in Warsaw. Buses such as: Hungarian Ikarus 242, West German Magirus-Deutz M170-S11H, French Berliet PR100, Italian FIAT 420A, British-Danish Leyland Lidrt 12/4 Worldmaster, Spaniard Pegaso 5023, Japanese Hino RC620 and Czechoslovak Karosa SM11 took part in the trials. Berliet PR110 was the most successful vehicle of all tested. From the very beginning this model 
was considered as temporary solution because of different transportation needs back then. PR110’s original design was later modified by adding third set of doors. New Jelcz PR110 was a 12 meters long bus with three sets of doors in a standard model. Approximately 50% of parts used to assemble Jelcz PR110 were imported directly from France.

The economical depression that struck Poland in 1980s resulted in Polish People's Republic government’s deficiency of foreign currency needed to buy parts necessary to build these vehicles. Parts imported from abroad needed to assemble one bus in the beginning of 1984 equalled to 2000 US dollars. It was also impossible to manufacture needed parts domestically. In addition, the WSK Mielec engine manufacturing plant could produce only up to 1,000 engines per year. Because of these shortcomings a decision was made to cooperate with Hungarian People's Republic. A trade agreement between Poland and Hungary was signed in Warsaw on October 24, 1983 and resulted in first deliveries of Hungarian made Ikarus 260 buses and Csepel 260.88 chassis (which were used inter alia in Ikarus 260 buses) to Poland. In return, the Hungarian side was receiving Polish Fiats 125p and 126p and Star trucks. According to the agreement, between 1986 and 1990, Hungarian People's Republic was obliged to deliver approximately 1500 complete chassis equipped with engines and gearboxes. Even then, the official statement was that Jelcz M11 (initially named Jelcz M110) was a temporary solution and its production will end once the all new Jelcz M120, is introduced. Many reliability issues that M11 was known for accelerated the introduction of the M120 model.

Production
New Jelcz M11 bus was based on Csepel chassis plate with the engine. Body was taken after little modification from Jelcz PR110. First prototype was made in 1983. During tests in Budapest scientists from the local polytechnic did computer endurance tests of structural elements. Serial production of Jelcz M11's began in 1984. New buses were being produced parallel with Jelcz PR110s, and till 1986 even with Jelcz 043. In 1990 production of M11 has been finished; about 2600 buses had been produced.

Exploitation

Jelcz M11's were placed to all city transport operators (every except Warsaw) from country distribution. To the Warsaw Jelcz M11's went in 90. years, where they were being mainly exploitated by private operators.

Modernization
In 1994 there have been created plans to adjust city buses to the needs of people with physical disabilities. For this purpose, expertise has been done, which concluded that the buses Jelcz M11, as well as based on the same floor plate Ikarus 260s/280s, are not suitable for fitting elevators. Where as building folding ramps was excluded because of too high floor plate. Because of this conception of building new buses have been created, even though partly low-floor, instead try to modernise current buses like western companies.

Construction
During the 6-year production period there were no important changes in the model.

Undercarriage

Jelcz M11's were equipped with Hungarian chassis Csepel 260.88. The same chassis plates were being used in Ikarus 260 buses. The vehicles were characterized by high flat floor. Chassis plate was the reason of most defects of Jelcz M11 but it allowed the exchange of engine parts between Jelcz M11 and Ikarus 260s and 280s.

Drivetrain 
The bus was powered by six-cylinder in-line diesel engine RABA-MAN D2156HM6U of a capacity 10350 cm³ and maximum power of 193 HP. The drive unit allowed achieve a maximum speed of 82 km/h. It was lower value than in Ikarus 260, Jelcz was supposed to be – contrary to the Hungarian bus – typical urban vehicle. Engine was located horizontally in the middle part of floor plate.

Power was transferred by 5-speed manual gearbox typu Csepel ASH 75.2. From the gearbox the power of engine was transferred by the driveshaft (Gewes production). Driveshaft drove the rear axle of the company Raba. In the bus was used rear axle RABA 118, newer than in Ikarus 260.

References

M11
Full-size buses
Buses
Step-entrance buses
Vehicles introduced in 1989